The 2015 ICC Women's World Twenty20 Qualifier was an international women's cricket tournament held in Thailand from 28 November to 5 December 2015. It was the second edition of the Women's World Twenty20 Qualifier.

Eight teams contested the tournament, with the hosts, Thailand, being joined by the bottom two teams from the 2014 World Twenty20 and five regional qualifiers. Ireland defeated Bangladesh in the final by two wickets, with both teams qualifying for the 2016 World Twenty20 tournament in India. Bangladesh's Rumana Ahmed was the player of the tournament and was the leading wicket-taker, while Ireland's Cecelia Joyce led the tournament in runs. All matches were played in Bangkok, with two grounds being used (the Thailand Cricket Ground and the Asian Institute of Technology Ground).

Qualification and format
The tournament involved eight teams, the same number as at the inaugural 2013 edition. For the preliminary stages of the tournament, the teams were divided into two groups of four, with the top two in each group moving into the semi-finals. The two winners of the semi-finals qualified for the 2016 World Twenty20. As in the 2013 tournament, the four teams that failed to make the semi-finals played off in a repechage competition (referred to as the Shield).

Of the eight teams, two (Bangladesh and Ireland) qualified automatically by finishing in the last two places at the 2014 World Twenty20. Thailand qualified for the tournament as the host, while the other five teams qualified through regional tournaments. Teams from the ICC Americas region were unable to qualify for the tournament, as funding had been withdrawn for the ICC Americas Women's Championship in 2014, leading to its cancellation. Instead, Europe was given an additional qualification spot. Bangladesh, China, Papua New Guinea, and Scotland participated in the Women's World Twenty20 Qualifier for the first time.

Squads

Group stages

Group A

Source: ESPNcricinfo

Group B

Source: ESPNcricinfo

Shield competition

Shield semi-finals

Shield final

Finals

Semi-finals

Final

Placement matches

Third-place playoff

Seventh-place playoff

Statistics

Most runs
The top five run scorers (total runs) are included in this table.

Source: ESPNcricinfo

Most wickets

The top five wicket takers are listed in this table, listed by wickets taken and then by bowling average.

Source: ESPNcricinfo

Final standings

 Qualified for the 2016 World Twenty20.

References

External links
 ESPNcricinfo tournament site

International cricket competitions in 2015–16
Sport in Bangkok
International women's cricket competitions in Thailand
2015 in Thai sport
Qualifier
2015 in women's cricket